Estadio Municipal de Castalia is a multi-purpose stadium in Castellón de la Plana, Spain.  It is currently used mostly for football matches and is the home ground of CD Castellón. The stadium holds 15,500 (all-seater) and was built in 1987, replacing the original Estadi Castàlia which stood on this site, but at 90° to the current layout. The pitch size is 102x70m.

References

External links
Estadios de Espana

Football venues in the Valencian Community
CD Castellón
Multi-purpose stadiums in Spain
Buildings and structures in the Province of Castellón
Sports venues completed in 1987